San Ignacio is a Chilean town and commune located in the Diguillín Province, Ñuble Region.

Demographics
According to data from the 2002 Census of Population and Housing, San Ignacio had 16,106 inhabitants; of these, 4,873 (30.3%) lived in urban areas and 11,233 (69.7%) in rural areas. At that time, there were 8,192 men and 7,914 women. Sanignacino is the demonym for a man, and Sanignacina is that of a woman.

Administration
As a commune, San Ignacio is a third-level administrative division of Chile administered by a municipal council, headed by an alcalde who is directly elected every four years. For the years 2008-2012, the alcalde is Nelson Aedo Figueroa (UDI), and the councilors are:
 Osiel Soto Lagos (UDI)
 Juan Muñoz Pérez (UDI)
 Rolando Flores Monsalve (UDI)
 Mauricio López Muñoz (RN)
 Patricio Hernán Chávez Benavente (PDC)
 Romeo Valdés Guerra (PS)

Within the electoral divisions of Chile, San Ignacio is represented in the Chamber of Deputies as a part of the 41st electoral district (together with Chillán, Coihueco, Pinto, El Carmen, Pemuco, Yungay and Chillán Viejo). The commune is represented in the Senate

References

See also
 List of towns in Chile

Communes of Chile
Populated places in Diguillín Province